Scotson is a surname. Notable persons with this name include:
Callum Scotson (born 1996), Australian cyclist
Frederick Scotson Clark (1840–1883), English organist and composer
Miles Scotson (born 1994), Australian cyclist, brother of Callum
Reg Scotson (1919–1999), English footballer